Kosmos 520 ( meaning Cosmos 520) was the first Soviet US-K missile early warning satellite. It was launched in 1972 as part of the Oko programme. The satellite is designed to identify missile launches using optical telescopes and infrared sensors. 
 
Kosmos 520 was launched from Site 41/1 at Plesetsk Cosmodrome in the Soviet Union. A Molniya-M carrier rocket with a 2BL upper stage was used to perform the launch, which took place at 19:19 UTC on 19 September 1972. The launch successfully placed the satellite into a molniya orbit. It subsequently received its Kosmos designation, and the international designator 1972-072A. The United States Space Command assigned it the Satellite Catalog Number 06192.

See also

List of Kosmos satellites (501–750)
List of R-7 launches (1970-1974)
1972 in spaceflight

References

External links
 Kosmos 520 in the Lavochkin museum - photograph from Novosti Kosmonavtiki, telescopes, infrared telescope, antenna

Kosmos satellites
1972 in spaceflight
Oko
Spacecraft launched by Molniya-M rockets
Spacecraft launched in 1972